Barytettix humphreysii, or Humphrey's grasshopper, is a species of spur-throated grasshopper in the family Acrididae. It is found in the southwestern United States and northwestern Mexico.

Subspecies
These subspecies belong to the species Barytettix humphreysii:
 Barytettix humphreysii cochisei Gurney, 1951
 Barytettix humphreysii humphreysii (Thomas, C., 1875)

References

External links

 

Melanoplinae
Insects described in 1875
Orthoptera of North America